Babz Chula (born Barbara Ellen Zuckerman; circa 1946 – May 7, 2010) was an American-born Canadian actress.

Chula spent her early childhood in the working-class neighbourhood of Jamaica, N.Y., but her widowed mother, Abby Zuckerman, a booking agent for Leonard Bernstein, moved her two young children, first to Hawaii and then to California, to pursue work in the entertainment field after Chula's father, Larry Zuckerman, an auto mechanic and stock-car racer, was killed in a car race. Growing up in Los Angeles, where her mother eventually remarried, Babz won a scholarship to the California Institute of the Arts and returned to New York after graduation to perform as a folk singer. In 1971 she and her first husband, Phillip Ciulla, relocated to Slocan Valley in British Columbia before moving to Vancouver, where she resumed her acting and singing career under the respelled stage name Chula. Her first major supporting role was in Sandy Wilson's award-winning film My American Cousin.

Chula was married to Larry Lynn,  who was ordained a Catholic priest after her death.

Selected filmography

Selected movies of the week
 2002 Croon as Liz
 2000 Becoming Dick as Waitress
 2000 Wednesday Woman as Andrea Glissner
 1999 Sweetwater as Rita
 1997 Jitters as Mrs. Hoffman 
 1997 Intensity as Mrs. John Q. Citizen
 1997 Seduction in a Small Town as Jesse Pence
 1997 Echo as Caseworker
 1996 For Hope as Doctor
 1994 Roommates as Norma
 1994 My Name is Kate as Nora 
 1993 Without a Kiss Goodbye as Unknown
 1993 Double, Double, Toil and Trouble as Madame Lulu
 1993 When a Stranger Calls Back as Agent
 1986 Mrs. Delafield Wants to Marry as Frieda

Selected television appearances
1991 The Commish - 6 episodes
1993–1996 Madison - 8 episodes
1998 Police Academy - 1 episode
2000–2003 Cold Squad - 1 episode
1999–2001 These Arms of Mine - 5 episodes
2002 Bliss - 1 episode
2002 John Doe - 1 episode
2000–2003 - Yvon of the Yukon - Unknown episodes
2004 The L Word - 1 episode
2004 The Days - 3 episodes
2007 Final 24 - 1 episode

Voice work

Captain N: The Game Master
Madeline
Captain Zed and the Zee Zone
Legend of the Hawaiian Slammers
G.I. Joe
Bucky O'Hare and the Toad Wars
Yvon of the Yukon
Camp Candy
Toon of the Month
Little Witch
Action Man
Christopher the Christmas Tree
Littlest Pet Shop
Funky Fables
Super Trolls

Recognition
2009 Leo Award Best Lead Performance by a Female in a Feature Length Drama
2008 Sam Payne Award
2006 Leo Award for Individual Outstanding Achievement
2002 Best supporting Actress New York Independent Film Festival (Bitten)
2001 Gemini Award for Best Actress in a Dramatic Series
1999, 2002 Leo Awards Nomination "Best Performance by a Female/Picture"
1996 Leo Award Winner "Best Actress"
1996 Woman of the Year by Woman in Film and Video
1995–1996 Jessie Award Outstanding Performance by an Actress in a Supporting Role
1992–1993 Jessie Award Outstanding Ensemble Cast

References

External links

Women in Film Canada

1946 births
2010 deaths
Actors from Springfield, Massachusetts
Actresses from New York City
Actresses from Vancouver
American expatriates in Canada
American film actresses
American impressionists (entertainers)
American television actresses
American voice actresses
Deaths from cancer in British Columbia
Best Actress in a Drama Series Canadian Screen Award winners
People from Queens, New York
Comedians from New York City
Comedians from Vancouver
21st-century American women